Faveria subdasyptera is a species of moth in the snout moth family (Pyralidae). It was described by Hiroshi Yamanaka in 2002 and is endemic to Okinawa, Japan.

References

Moths described in 2002
Endemic fauna of Japan
Phycitini
Moths of Japan